Özgür Aktaş (born 27 January 1997) is a Dutch professional footballer who plays as a defender for Eerste Divisie club Telstar.

Club career

Vitesse
Born in Cuijk, Aktaş started his career at local club JVC Cuijk and joined the youth academy of Vitesse in 2012. In 2015, he moved to the youth academy of NEC. In March 2017, Aktaş, together with Lars Kramer, was promoted to the first team by head coach Peter Hyballa due to injuries on their position. On 5 April 2017, he sat on the bench once during the away match in the Eredivisie against FC Groningen, but did not make an appearance. In the 2017–18 season, Aktaş again played for the second team, Jong NEC, in the Beloften Eredivisie.

In 2018, Aktaş returned to Vitesse where he joined their second team, Jong Vitesse, who competed in the Tweede Divisie. He made 28 appearances in which he scored 4 goals. At the end of the 2018–19 season, he was brought into the first-team squad and sat on the bench twice during the play-offs. The 2019–20 season again saw Aktaş play for Jong Vitesse, now playing in the Beloften Competitie. At the beginning of September, a transfer to FC Den Bosch did not materialise and later that month, Aktaş, together with Patrick Vroegh, were promoted to the Vitesse first team by head coach Leonid Slutsky. Under caretaker manager Joseph Oosting, Aktaş made his professional debut for Vitesse on 17 December 2019 in the KNVB Cup home matchup against ODIN '59 in which he replaced Danilho Doekhi after 85 minutes. His contract expired in the summer of 2020, making him a free agent.

Fortuna Sittard
In August 2020, Aktaş was signed by Fortuna Sittard, who sent him directly on a season-long loan to Eerste Divisie club FC Dordrecht. After returning from his loan, his contract was not renewed, making him a free agent.

Telstar
In August 2021, Aktaş signed with SC Telstar. He made his official debut on 13 August in a 2–2 draw against NAC Breda, coming on as a substitute for Jip Molenaar in the 75th minute. On 17 September, he scored his first goal for Telstar, which proved to be the match-winner in the 1–0 away win over his former club Dordrecht.

International career
He is available to represent for either the Netherlands or Turkey, being born in the Netherlands and is of Turkish descent.

References

External links

1997 births
Living people
Dutch footballers
Dutch people of Turkish descent
Association football defenders
People from Cuijk
JVC Cuijk players
SBV Vitesse players
Fortuna Sittard players
FC Dordrecht players
SC Telstar players
Eerste Divisie players
Footballers from North Brabant